Grant's Trail is a mixed-use trail in St. Louis County, Missouri, that begins at the River Des Peres Greenway at River City Boulevard and I-55 and runs northwest to Holmes Ave and I-44 in Kirkwood. It connects the Meramec River Greenway to the River des Peres Greenway.

Location

Kirkwood (western) trailhead: 
St. Louis (eastern) trailhead: 
St. Louis (eastern) terminus:

See also
The Great Rivers Greenway District

External links 
 Trail information
 Grant's Trail attractions

References

Hiking trails in Missouri
Geography of St. Louis County, Missouri
Tourist attractions in St. Louis